The Year's Best Science Fiction: Twenty-Fourth Annual Collection is a science fiction anthology edited by Gardner Dozois that was published in 2007.  It is the 24th in The Year's Best Science Fiction series.

Contents

The book includes a 29-page summation by Dozois; 28 stories, all that first appeared in 2006, and each with a two-paragraph introduction by Dozois; and a ten-page referenced list of honorable mentions for the year. For the second year in a row, this book includes two stories by Alastair Reynolds. The stories are as follows.

Cory Doctorow: "I, Row-boat"
Robert Charles Wilson: "Julian: A Christmas Story"
Michael Swanwick: Tin Marsh"
Ian McDonald: "The Djinn's Wife"
Benjamin Rosenbaum: "The House Beyond Your Sky"
Kage Baker: "Where the Golden Apples Grow"
Bruce McAllister: "Kin"
Alastair Reynolds: "Signal To Noise"
Jay Lake and Ruth Nestvold: "The Big Ice"
Gregory Benford: "Bow Shock"
Justin Stanchfield: "In the River"
Walter Jon Williams: "Incarnation Day"
Greg van Eekhout: "Far As You Can Go"
Robert Reed: "Good Mountain"
David D. Levine: "I Hold My Father's Paws"
Paul J. McAuley: "Dead Men Walking"
Mary Rosenblum: "Home Movies"
Daryl Gregory: "Damascus"
Jack Skillingstead: "Life On the Preservation"
Paolo Bacigalupi: "Yellow Card Man"
Greg Egan: "Riding the Crocodile"
Elizabeth Bear and Sarah Monette: "The Ile of Dogges"
Ken MacLeod: "The Highway Men"
Stephen Baxter: "The Pacific Mystery"
Carolyn Ives Gilman: "Okanoggan Falls"
John Barnes: "Every Hole Is Outlined"
A. M. Dellamonica: "The Town On Blighted Sea"
Alastair Reynolds: "Nightingale"

External links
Review and synopsis by Brad Shorr

2007 anthologies
24
St. Martin's Press books